The Pucci family has been a prominent noble family in Florence over the course of many centuries. A recent notable member of this family was Emilio Pucci, an Italian fashion designer who founded a clothing company after World War II.

History
The family surname derives from an ancestor named Jacopo, informally Jacopuccio, abbreviated to Puccio, who was considered wise and frequently called upon to settle disputes – there are records of two such interventions in 1264 and 1287. Their former surname seems to have been Saracini, which explains the presence of a "maure" (moor's head) on the Pucci family's coat of arms, as one ancestor been part in the First Crusade. Earlier, this family arrived to Florence through Siena from Rome, its roots being discovered in the Julia family of Roman Emperors.

The first Pucci family members to be mentioned date from the 13th century, with their subscribing to the Arte dei Legnaioli. These early members included Antonio Pucci, who worked as an architect on the construction of the Loggia della Signoria. His son, Puccio Pucci, was a merchant who became rich thanks to trade and financial activities in medieval Florence. The first Pucci residences were in the Santa Croce district of Florence, before they moved to that of the church of San Michele Visdomini.

They were supporters of the Guelphs, thus they were expelled and their houses demolished after the battle of Montaperti in 1260. However, they were soon able to return upon the Ghibellines' expulsion from the city. With wealth came political offices such as magistracies, priories and gonfalonieres – the Pucci family produced a total of 23 priors and 8 holders of the post of confaloniere di giustizia.

Constant allies of the Medici during the Renaissance, the Pucci were among the families that Cosimo de' Medici called upon as a means of indirectly pursuing his own political interests. Trusted Medici allies from the Pucci family included Puccio Pucci, who provided Cosimo with money to improve his living conditions in prison whilst Cosimo was imprisoned prior to being exiled. In the early 16th century, the Pucci family's prestige rose yet higher, with it producing three cardinals (Roberto, Lorenzo and Antonio Pucci) within a few decades of each other and continuing to be trusted figures in the Medici's ducal and then grand-ducal courts.

However, a momentary bitter break with the Medici family came in 1559, when Pandolfo Pucci was ousted from the court of Cosimo I for dreaming of restoring the ancient Republic of Florence. Thus, for revenge or ideological reasons, he conspired against Cosimo with the support of other noble Florentine families, intending to fire an arquebus at Cosimo as he and his retinue walked along the corner of Palazzo Pucci and Via de' Servi to get to Santissima Annunziata. The plan had already been shelved, but after the Medici intelligence network got wind of it, Pandolfo was hung from a window of the Bargello and the Pucci properties were seized, and the most dangerous part of the family been exiled to Sicily where the surname changed into Puccio. As a memorial to the quashing of the plot, or perhaps out of prudence or superstition, it was decided to brick up the window at the corner where the attack was to have occurred, as can still be seen.

The Pucci family later made peace with the Medici, and Niccolò Pucci regained the Palazzo Pucci and its furnishings. In 1662, Orazio Roberto Pucci acquired the fiefdom of Barsento (Bari) for 4,000 scudi and obtained the title of Marchese di Barsento, a noble title which has since been handed down through the family.

The most recent notable family member is Emilio Pucci, founder of the namesake post-war fashion house, who became famous in the 1960s for his prints, fabrics, and designs. His brother, Puccio Pucci di Barsento, a lawyer and architect, served during WWII as a pilot in the acrobatic squadron of the Italian Air Force. In the 1960s, the two brothers split the Palazzo Pucci, with Emilio taking the left half as the main base for his fashion house. Puccio took the most ancient part, with the central entrance, restoring it and adapting it to the needs of the time with a gallery of artisan workshops that is still thriving today. His son, Giannozzo Pucci, a noted publisher and ecologist, utilized the Palazzo's rooftop to create the only organic garden in a landmark Italian Renaissance building, where he cultivates rare types of vegetables to produce seeds for a worldwide network of seed-savers. Giannozzo's younger sister, Idanna Pucci, is a writer and documentary filmmaker, whose most recent books are "The World Odyssey of a Balinese Prince" (Tuttle Publishing) and "The Lady of Sing Sing" (Simon and Schuster), both released in 2020.

Patronage

Puccio Pucci in 1445 showed interest acquiring the main chapel of the still-to-be constructed tribune of the SS. Annunziata (the later site of the Cappella della Madonna del Soccorso). From 1452, his son, Antonio Pucci began to contribute funds to the construction of the Oratory of San Sebastiano of the church of Santissima Annunziata, for which he commissioned Piero del Pollaiuolo's painting of the Martyrdom of Saint Sebastian (now in the National Gallery, London).The family also collected art, including four paintings commissioned by Lorenzo the Magnificent from Sandro Botticelli as a gift to Giannozzo Pucci on Giannozzo's marriage to Lucrezia Bini in 1483. These paintings tell the story of Nastalgio degli Onesti and the first three in the narrative are now in the Prado in Madrid. The painting still in Florence shows the use of forks, which were traditionally adopted for the first time in Florence by the Pucci, who can be considered the family that invented the fork, and whose use Catherine de'Medici then spread across Europe. It also depicts the actual tableware and silver vessels used by the family, which were allegedly from the workshops of Verrocchio and Pollaiolo.

The Pucci commissioned several works for the churches neighbouring their palazzo. For the church of San Michele Visdomini, in 1518 Francesco Pucci commissioned Pontormo to paint the Holy family with saints, which was described by Vasari as one of the best paintings by an Empolese painter. Whilst he was archbishop of Bologna, cardinal Antonio Pucci commissioned Raphael to paint a scene of The Ecstasy of Saint Cecilia - now moved to the city's Pinacoteca. At the end of the 16th century, Lorenzo Pucci commissioned Alessandro Allori to paint a Marriage at Cana as an altarpiece for the church of Sant'Agata (completed 1600).

The family's palazzo was rebuilt by the grand-ducal architect Bernardo Buontalenti in the second half of the 16th century. Between 1585 and 1595 abbot Alessandro Pucci built the Villa di Bellosguardo, to designs by Giovanni Antonio Dosio - it remained a family property until 1858. The Pucci completed the portico of the church of Santissima Annunziata, in a stylistic unity with the piazza outside (the Pucci device is to be seen on the pavement in front of the entrance and on both sides of the portico) - an inscription on the frieze and a plaque on Via Gino Capponi gives its completion date as 1601.

Works linked to the Pucci family

Palazzo Pucci, Florence
Palazzo Pucci, Rome
Palazzo Pucci di Ottavio
Basilica Church of the Santissima Annunziata, Florence
Church of San Michele Visdomini
Church of Sant'Agata
 Nastagio degli Onesti
 Martyrdom of Saint Sebastian
 Pala Pucci
Castello di Oliveto (built by the Pucci in the 15th century)
Villa di Bellosguardo
Villa Pucci (Villa di Granaiolo)

Notable members
Its members included:
Antonio di Puccio Pucci (c. 1350–1416), Florentine politician and architect
Puccio Pucci (1389–1449), Florentine politician, son of Antonio
Giannozzo Pucci (15th century), whose marriage to Lucrezia Bini was the occasion for the painting of the Nastagio degli Onesti
Francesco Pucci (Florence 1437–1518), Florentine politician, commissioned a work from Jacopo Pontormo
Lorenzo Pucci (1458–1531), Italian cardinal
Roberto Pucci (1462–1547), Italian cardinal
Antonio Pucci (cardinal) (1485–1544), Italian cardinal
Pandolfo Pucci (d. 2 January 1560), responsible for the Pucci plot
Orazio Roberto Pucci (Florence, 1625–1698), first Marchese di Barsento
Emilio Pucci (Naples 1914 – Florence 1992), fashion designer and politician
Puccio Pucci di Barsento (Naples 1915 – Florence 2016), lawyer, architect
Giannozzo Pucci (Rome 1944 - ), publisher, ecologist
Idanna Pucci (1945 - ), author, filmmaker

Notes

Bibliography
 Marcello Vannucci, Le grandi famiglie di Firenze, Newton Compton Editori, 2006

External links

The Emilio Pucci fashion house
 The Pucci and the Villa di Bellosguardo

 
Political families of Italy
Italian noble families